Rinzia oxycoccoides, commonly known as the Large flowered rinzia, is a plant species of the family Myrtaceae endemic to Western Australia.

It blooms from September to January producing pink-red flowers.

It is found on hillsides in a small area along the south coast where the Great Southern meets the Goldfields-Esperance region of Western Australia centred around the Fitzgerald River National Park where it grows in stony skeletal soils.

References

oxycoccoides
Endemic flora of Western Australia
Myrtales of Australia
Rosids of Western Australia
Plants described in 1852
Taxa named by Nikolai Turczaninow